Ali Bakar (18 November 1947 – 16 August 2003) was a football player who represented the Malaysian national football team from 1970 until 1976. He played for Penang FA in Malaysia's domestic competition.

Career overview
A midfielder, Ali was a squad player for the Malaysia team in the 1972 Munich Olympics football competition, and also represented Malaysia when it finished third in the 1974 Asian Games in Iran. Also in 1974, he was part of the Malaysia Cup-winning Penang side.  After two years, he also helped Penang side to win the international tournament, Aga Khan Gold Cup held in Dhaka.

Personal life
Ali's brother, Isa Bakar, was a football player, also playing for Penang and Malaysia.

Ali suffered a heart attack and died on the field while playing in a charity football match in Singapore on 16 August 2003. His body was buried in Penang. In 2004, he was inducted in Olympic Council of Malaysia's Hall of Fame for 1972 Summer Olympics football team.

Honours

Penang
Burnley Cup: 1966
 Malaysia Kings Gold Cup: 1966, 1968, 1969
 Malaysia Cup: 1974
 Aga Khan Gold Cup: 1976

Malaysia
 Bronze medal Asian Games: 1974
 Kings Cup: 1972
 Merdeka Cup: 1974, 1976
 Jakarta Anniversary Tournament: 1970

See also
List of association footballers who died while playing

References

External links
 Profile at Sports Council, Prison Department of Malaysia

1947 births
2003 deaths
Malaysian footballers
Malaysia international footballers
People from Penang
Penang F.C. players
Olympic footballers of Malaysia
Footballers at the 1972 Summer Olympics
1976 AFC Asian Cup players
Association football players who died while playing
Asian Games bronze medalists for Malaysia
Asian Games medalists in football
Association football forwards
Medalists at the 1974 Asian Games
Sport deaths in Singapore
Footballers at the 1974 Asian Games